Bernard Cook (15 March 1879 – 15 March 1944) was an Australian cricketer. He played in seven first-class matches for Queensland between 1909 and 1913.

See also
 List of Queensland first-class cricketers

References

External links
 

1879 births
1944 deaths
Australian cricketers
Queensland cricketers
Sportspeople from Torquay
British emigrants to Australia